White Ash Green is a hamlet in the Braintree district of Essex, England.

It is a little over a mile west of the town of Halstead; the village of Gosfield is also nearby.

It is part of Greenstead Green and Halstead Rural civil parish.

References 

Hamlets in Essex
Braintree District